Stamen Belchev (Bulgarian: Стамен Белчев; born 7 May 1969) is a former Bulgarian footballer.

Career

Manager career
In March 2015, Belchev was appointed as manager of his hometown club Haskovo, succeeding Emil Velev. He was manager until the end of the season. Later, on July 13, 2015 he was announced as manager of Litex Lovech II, the reserve team of former Bulgarian champions Litex Lovech which competed in B Group, the second level of Bulgarian football.

On 27 November 2016, following the resignation of Edward Iordănescu, Belchev was appointed as interim manager of CSKA Sofia. On 3 January 2017 he was appointed as a permanent manager of the team, signing a contract until the end of the season. In early June 2017, it was announced that Belchev would remain as manager for the next season.

On 6 March 2019 Stamen Belchev was appointed as the new manager of Arda Kardzhali, after Stoev was signed with the Bulgarian champions Ludogorets Razgrad. After a successful period that culminated in the team's first ever promotion to the top flight of Bulgarian football, he parted ways with the club by mutual consent in April 2020.

Managerial statistics

Honours
3rd place in the football manager of the year in Bulgaria ranking - 2017.

References 

1969 births
Living people
Bulgarian footballers
Bulgarian football managers
FC Haskovo players
FC Lokomotiv Gorna Oryahovitsa players
PFC Beroe Stara Zagora players
PFC CSKA Sofia managers
First Professional Football League (Bulgaria) players
People from Haskovo
Association football forwards
Sportspeople from Haskovo Province
20th-century Bulgarian people